The Lockheed Martin Desert Hawk is a miniature UAV used for base perimeter protection. It was designed by Lockheed Martin's Skunk Works for the United States Air Force Force Protection Airborne Surveillance System (FPASS) Program on a quick-reaction contract issued late in the winter of 2002, with the first system delivered in the early summer. It was designed quickly, because the program leveraged technology and design studies developed for the MicroStar MAVs. The program was run by Electronic Systems Center.  In 2007, the U.S. Air Force FPASS office switched all of their UAV systems over to the RQ-11B Raven.

It is made mostly of plastic foam, resembling hobby grade model airplanes, and uses an electric motor driving a pusher propeller as a powerplant, making it very quiet. It is launched with a bungee cord, carries three small CCD cameras, has an endurance of about an hour. It flies mostly under autonomous control, with the operator keeping track of its activity with a laptop computer.

The Desert Hawk is also used by the 32nd Regiment Royal Artillery of the British Army as a tactical surveillance system, and has been used in Afghanistan and Mali.

Desert Hawk has since been replaced with the more capable and rugged Desert Hawk III.

Specifications
 Wingspan: 52 in (1.32 m)
 Length: 34 in  (0.86 m)
 Weight: 7 lb (3.2 kg)
 Engine: electric motor driving a quiet pusher propeller
 Endurance: approx. 1 hour

References

External links

 Official website
 Desert Hawk: Mini UAV Goes Operational, CodeOne Magazine, 2003
 DESERT HAWK UP: New Small Unmanned Aerial Vehicles, Part 1, Military.com
 , 332 AEW Public Affairs, 10/24/2003
 , 379 AEW Public Affairs, 7/21/2004
 Desert Hawk III - Armed Forces International
 Lockheed Martin Flies First 360-degree Infrared Sensor on Small Unmanned Aircraft System, Lockheed Martin Press Release 8/10/2009

Unmanned aerial vehicles of the United States
Desert Hawk
2000s United States military reconnaissance aircraft
Single-engined pusher aircraft